René Dupuy (17 May 1920 – 1 August 2009) was a French actor, theater director and theater manager.

A student at the Conservatoire national d'art dramatique in Paris, René Dupuy was later theater manager of:
 the Théâtre Gramont from 1954 to 1973, 
 the Théâtre de l'Athénée from 1966 to 1972,  
 the Théâtre Fontaine from 1972 to 1985.

Theatre

Comedian 

 1950: Henri IV by William Shakespeare, directed by Jean Vilar, Festival d'Avignon 
 1950: Le Cid by Corneille, directed by Jean Vilar, Festival d'Avignon 
 1950: Le Bal des voleurs by Jean Anouilh, directed by André Barsacq, Théâtre des Arts
 1951: The Prince of Homburg by Heinrich von Kleist, directed by Jean Vilar, Festival d'Avignon 
 1956: Irma la douce by Marguerite Monnot, directed by René Dupuy, Théâtre Gramont 
 1958: Édition de midi by Mihail Sebastian, directed by René Dupuy, Théâtre Gramont
 1963: You never can tell by George Bernard Shaw, directed by René Dupuy, Théâtre Gramont
 1965: Pantagleize by Michel de Ghelderode, directed by René Dupuy, Théâtre Gramont
 1966: La Convention de Belzébir by Marcel Aymé, directed by René Dupuy, Théâtre de l'Athénée
 1966: Exit the King by Eugène Ionesco, directed by Jacques Mauclair, Théâtre de l'Athénée
 1970: Exit the King by Eugène Ionesco, directed by Jacques Mauclair, Théâtre de l'Athénée
 1977:  : Les Petits Oiseaux d'Eugène Labiche, directed by René Dupuy, TV director Pierre Sabbagh, Théâtre Marigny
 1984: Au théâtre ce soir : La Pomme by Louis Verneuil and Georges Berr, directed by René Dupuy, TV director Pierre Sabbagh, Théâtre Marigny

Theatre director 

 1948: La Vengeance d'une orpheline russe by Henri Rousseau, Théâtre de l'Œuvre
 1949: La Vengeance d'une orpheline russe by Henri Rousseau, Studio des Champs-Élysées
 1951: La calandria by Bernardo Dovizi da Bibbiena, Festival d'Avignon 
 1954: Le Héros et le soldat by George Bernard Shaw, Théâtre Gramont
 1956: À la monnaie du Pape by Louis Velle, Théâtre Gramont
 1956: Irma la douce by Alexandre Breffort and Marguerite Monnot, Théâtre Gramont 
 1956: The Playboy of the Western World by John Millington Synge, Théâtre Gramont
 1957: Pericles, Prince of Tyre by William Shakespeare, Théâtre de l'Ambigu
 1958: Édition de midi by Mihail Sebastian, Théâtre Gramont
 1959: La Double Vie de Théophraste Longuet by Jean Rougeul after Gaston Leroux, Théâtre Gramont  
 1960: La Petite Datcha by Vasiliei Vasil'evitch Chkvarkin, Théâtre Daunou
 1961: Visa pour l'amour by Raymond Vinci and Francis Lopez, Gaîté lyrique
 1961: Un certain monsieur Blot by Robert Rocca after Pierre Daninos, Théâtre Gramont
 1962: À notre âge on a besoin d'amour and La Cloison by Jean Savy, Théâtre de l'Alliance française
 1962: Le Timide au palais by Tirso de Molina, Théâtre Gramont 
 1963: You never can tell by George Bernard Shaw, Théâtre Gramont
 1964: Les Fausses Confidences de Marivaux, Théâtre de l'Ambigu
 1965: Pantagleize by Michel de Ghelderode, Théâtre Gramont
 1965: Du vent dans les branches de sassafras by René de Obaldia, Théâtre Gramont 
 1966: La Convention de Belzébir by Marcel Aymé, Théâtre de l'Athénée-Louis-Jouvet
 1967: A Report to an Academy by Franz Kafka, Théâtre Gramont
 1968: After the Rain by John Griffith Bowen, Théâtre de l'Athénée-Louis-Jouvet
 1969: Les Grosses Têtes by Jean Poiret and Michel Serrault, directed by and with Jean Poiret, Théâtre de l'Athénée-Louis-Jouvet
 1969: Popaul et Juliette by André Maheux and Mireille Hartuch, Théâtre Gramont
 1971: Fortune and Men's Eyes by John Herbert, Théâtre de l'Athénée
 1972: Le Roi des cons by Georges Wolinski, Théâtre Fontaine 
 1973: Chante, Papa, chante by Marcel Moussy, Théâtre des Nouveautés
 1974:  : Le Vison à cinq pattes by Constance Coline after Peter Coke, TV director Jean Royer, Théâtre Marigny
 1977: Au théâtre ce soir: Les Petits Oiseaux by Eugène Labiche, TV director Pierre Sabbagh, Théâtre Marigny  
 1979: Troilus and Cressida by William Shakespeare, Théâtre Fontaine 
 1982: Lili Lamont by Arthur Whithney, Théâtre Fontaine
 1984: Au théâtre ce soir: La Pomme by Louis Verneuil and Georges Berr, TV director Pierre Sabbagh, Théâtre Marigny
 1988: Exit the King by Eugène Ionesco

External links 
 

French male actors
French theatre directors
French theatre managers and producers
Male actors from New York City
1920 births
2009 deaths
American emigrants to France